The 2009 World Netball Series was the inaugural tournament of the World Netball Series. The 2009 Series was held at MEN Arena in Manchester, England from 9–11 October, and was the first major trial of the new FastNet rules that were announced by the International Federation of Netball Associations (IFNA) in 2008. New Zealand won the 2009 tournament with a 32–27 victory over Jamaica in the gold medal playoff.

Organisation 
The 2009 World Netball Series was played under FastNet rules, which were designed to make games faster and more television-friendly, with the ultimate aim of raising the sport's profile and attracting more spectators and greater sponsorship. Netball is now following in the footsteps of cricket and rugby in providing a shorter version of the game to appease existing netball fans and grab the attention of new ones. It was organised by the International Federation of Netball Associations (IFNA), in conjunction with the national governing bodies of the six competing nations, as well as the Manchester City Council, England Netball, the Northwest Regional Development Agency (NWDA) and UK Sport. The Manchester City Council and UK Sport also contributed funding for the inaugural tournament. The Co-operative Group were announced as title sponsors for the 2009 Series.

The 2009 World Netball Series was telecast in Australia by Network Ten; in Jamaica by Television Jamaica; in New Zealand by TV ONE; and in the United Kingdom by Sky Sports.

Partners / Sponsors 
The 2009 World Netball Series was a new and exciting opportunity for those that have wanted to support netball to assist in making the series a success. This recent event has enabled a number of local and international companies to get behind the new concept of FastNet netball. The following were the sponsors for the 2009 World Netball Series:

-The Co-operative Group who assists with the netball development in the UK.

-ASICS U.K and Ireland provided netball shoes for this event in that performance and movement is crucial.

-Shock Absorber sports bra is an essential piece of clothing for any netball player. As well as the 2009 World Netball Series the shock absorber bra is also involved in the development of England's senior team, Under 21 and Under 19 Netball teams.

-Manchester City Council.

-The North West Development Agency (NWDA).

-UK sport.

-The International Federation of Netball Associations (IFNA) is the sole recognised federation for netball. Currently, over 60 National Netball Associations are affiliated to IFNA, grouped into 5 Regions – Africa, Asia, Americas, Europe and Oceania, then each have their own regional federation.
 
-England Netball is the governing body for enhancing the netball in England. It is a company limited by guarantee and comprises approximately 3,000 Clubs and some 68,000 affiliated members. Netball is largely driven by the efforts of many volunteers operating at a national, regional, county and community level, and the England netball association can help with this.

-Gilbert are the exclusive supplier to IFNA as well as New Zealand, Australia, Jamaica, South Africa, Scotland Wales, Barbados, Trinidad & Tobago, Malawi Nigeria and USA Netball.

-Monkhouse Intersport sold exclusive merchandise for the 2009 World Netball Series.

-Matalan retail

-Slazenger S1 Sports Drink is the official sports drink of the 2009 World Netball Series.

-Manchester Evening News Arena. It is sometimes described as the ‘voice of Manchester’ for anything that is occurring there, like the 2009 world netball series.

Volunteers 
The 2009 World Netball Series required a number of volunteers to make this event happen. Without the time and energy volunteers give, this series would not have been possible. Here are the volunteer's roles that the 2009 World Netball Series required.

Match Statistics
-Updating scores on The Co-operative World Netball Series website and providing score sheets for teams.

Programme Distributors
-Operating the programme sales desk.
Informing spectators of promotional offers and competitions.
Handling money and ensure that it is stored securely.

Accreditation Crew
-Distribution of Accreditation passes and welcome packs.
Production of additional passes.

Runners
-On hand to assist the Operations Manager e.g. ice baths, moving equipment etc.

Media Liaisons
-Ensure that media requirements are met throughout the event.
Carry out any other duties that may be reasonably required e.g. basic office admin assistance.

VIP reception
-Greet VIP's and direct them to the designated VIP area.
Support the VIP Manager and carry out any other duties that may be reasonably required.

VIP host
-Look after VIP's throughout the event in the designated VIP area.
Support the VIP Manager and carry out any other duties that may be reasonably required.

Stewards
-Ensure public, players and officials are directed to the correct areas and do not enter restricted areas.
Check that event staff, officials and spectators are in possession of the correct accreditation pass or tickets.

Ball Patrol 
-A vital part of officiating team.
Active role in ensuring game runs smoothly.
Ensuring ball is quickly recovered when it goes out of play.

TVNZ demographics and ratings 

World Series- Television New Zealand

Demographic: All 05+     (source: TVmap/AGB Nielsen Media Research)

Demographic: All 25-54     (source: TVmap/AGB Nielsen Media Research)

Demographic: Females 25-54     (source: TVmap/AGB Nielsen Media Research)

Teams 
The six teams featuring in the 2009 Series were chosen at the end of 2008 from the top six nations of the IFNA World Rankings at that time. These teams were (in descending order of ranking): Australia, New Zealand, England, Jamaica, Malawi and Samoa. Team rosters were announced prior to the start of the tournament. Samoa confirmed their participation at the tournament a few days after their country was devastated in the 2009 Samoa earthquake and tsunami.

Format 
The tournament comprised 20 matches played over three days from 9–11 October. Each team played each other once during the first two days in a round-robin format. The four highest-ranked teams from this stage progressed to the finals, played on the final day of competition, in which the 1st-ranked team played the 4th-ranked team, while 2nd played 3rd. The winners of these two matches then contested the Grand Final; the remaining teams contested the third- and fifth-place playoffs.

Fixtures

Finals

Final placings

Future of FastNet 
The future of FastNet netball seems to be up in the air at present; however, New Zealand has shown interest in the game and its modifications. There has been an idea that this game could be introduced into NZ's netball domestic league and involve a younger generation in the game throughout NZ. Although the tournament is definitely in England for the next year, it is unknown where it will go next.

References 

2009
World
World
International sports competitions in Manchester
2009 in Australian netball
2009 in New Zealand netball
2009 in English netball
Net
2009 in Samoan sport
2009 in Jamaican sport